The 2001 French Open was the second Grand Slam event of 2001 and the 100th edition of the French Open. It took place at the Stade Roland Garros in Paris, France, from late May through early June, 2001.

Todd Woodbridge and Mark Woodforde were the defending champions, but Woodforde retired from tennis in 2000. Woodbridge played alongside Jonas Björkman, they lost to Michael Hill and Jeff Tarango in the quarterfinals.

Unseeded team Mahesh Bhupathi and Leander Paes won their title, defeating Petr Pála and Pavel Vízner in the final.

Seeds
Champion seeds are indicated in bold text while text in italics indicates the round in which those seeds were eliminated.

Draw

Finals

Top half

Section 1

Section 2

Bottom half

Section 3

Section 4

References

External links
Association of Tennis Professionals (ATP) – main draw
2001 French Open – Men's draws and results at the International Tennis Federation

Men's Doubles
French Open by year – Men's doubles